The Deutscher Pfadfinderbund (1945) (DPB) is an independent, interdenominational German Scout association and is a member of the Ring junger Bünde (Ring of Youth Societies). It was founded in 1945 by Walther Jansen and Ebbo Plewe and consists of a boy section, a girl section, the Order of St. George on the youth section and the Order of St. Christopher, and is a purely voluntary organization.

External links 
http://meissner-2013.de/b%C3%BCnde/deutscher-pfadfinderbund

Scouting and Guiding in Germany